The Fulton FA-2 Airphibian was an American roadable aircraft manufactured in 1946.

Development

Designed by Robert Edison Fulton Jr., it was an aluminum-bodied car, built with independent suspension, aircraft-sized wheels, and a six-cylinder 165 hp engine.  The fabric wings were easily attached to the fuselage, converting the car into a plane. Four prototypes were built.

In December 1950, the Civil Aeronautics Administration (CAA) (later to become the FAA) certified one of the prototypes and gave it an 1A11 Aircraft Specification, N74104. Lou Achitoff, was the CAA test pilot. The N74154 is the aircraft that is today in the main building of the National Air and Space Museum in Washington, DC, having previously been on display in the Steven F. Udvar-Hazy Center.

The craft made its debut in November 1946 at Danbury, Connecticut. Financial concerns forced Fulton to sell to a company that never developed it.

Design
The Airphibian took the approach of converting from an aircraft to a roadable vehicle by a conversion process that left aircraft sections behind during road use. The process consisted of removing a three-bladed propeller and placing it on a hook on the side of the fuselage, cranking down support casters, and disengaging lock levers connecting the flight unit to the road unit. The wing and aft fuselage are detached for road use.

Survivors
In the mid-1990s, one of the surviving Airphibians was restored by Fulton III, along with David Dumas and Deborah Hanson. Later, it was put on display for several years at the Canada Aviation Museum in Ottawa, Ontario, Canada in their main display hall, but in 2009 it moved to the Steven F. Udvar-Hazy Center (annex of the National Air and Space Museum). Since 2022 it has been on display in the National Air and Space Museum in Washington, DC.

Specifications

See also
 Aerocar
 Aerocar Aero-Plane
 Aerocar Coot

References

 Bridgman, Leonard. Jane's All The World's Aircraft 1951–52. London: Sampson Low, Marston & Company, Ltd, 1951.

External links
 What Its Like To Fly A Car detailed July 1952 Popular Science article 
 Fulton Airphibian
 www.Airphibian.com — a Web site dedicated to the people who designed, built and tested the Airphibian

Roadable aircraft
High-wing aircraft
Single-engined tractor aircraft
Aircraft first flown in 1946